The Xeni Gwetʼin First Nation is a First Nations government located in the southwestern Chilcotin District in the western Central Interior region of the Canadian province of British Columbia.  It is a member of the Tsilhqotʼin Tribal Council.

The Xeni Gwetʼin First Nation reserve community and offices are located at the wilderness community of Nemaia Valley, which lies between Chilko Lake and the Taseko Lakes.

Chief and councillors

Roger William (Chief 1991-2008) was once again elected Chief on February 27, 2013 replacing Marilyn Baptiste, who served since 2010. William most recently served as Councillor with Xeni Gwetʼin. The vote was tallied at 133 to 94 William over Baptiste. Most observers regard this community as one of the best-managed in the area.

Treaty process

Xeni Gwetʼin First Nation Government chose not to take part in the British Columbia Treaty Process claiming it out-dated and ineffective, and instead fought for Aboriginal Rights and Title through the Canadian judicial system. On June 26, 2014, in Tsilhqotʼin Nation v British Columbia, The Supreme Court of Canada acknowledged Aboriginal Title to approximately 1800 square kilometres of the Nation's traditional territory - a first for any aboriginal group in Canada.

Demographics

There are about 300 people living on the reserve, with a handful of non-native people in the area. Plus they have approximately 300 quajus horses split in multiple herds! And their numbers of horses are getting bigger each year.

Economic development

The band has an active business management program, which runs the local roads yard as well as a gas-bar.  Many new houses have been built in the subdivision area near the band office, with an electrical grid.

The area is not served by the main BC Hydro grid, and so (except for the subdivision) all houses are run on generators and solar power.

Social, educational and cultural programs and facilities

The band has taken over the management of its health program, the only one of the Chilcotin communities to do so.

The local school runs from kindergarten to grade 8 in three classrooms; it is unusual for the area in having mostly long-term residents as teachers.

See also

Carrier-Chilcotin Tribal Council
Chilko Lake
Chilcotin language
Chilcotin District
Chilcotin War
Klattasine
Tsilhqotʼin
Tsilhqotʼin Tribal Council
Tsʼylos Provincial Park

External links
Xeni Gwetʼin homepage
Article on "Xeni decision" in The Tyee

Tsilhqot'in governments